Erpobdella testacea is a species of Erpobdella.

It is native to Europe.

The species was described in 1822 by Jules-César Savigny as Nephelis testacea.

References

testacea